Konstantinos Apostolopoulos (born 8 July 1993) is a Greek professional footballer who plays as striker for Greek club Aiolikos.

Career

On 29 November 2012, during a Greek Cup match vs. Proodeftiki, he made his official debut for the men's team with Panathinaikos.
On 2014 joins Panachaiki as a loan transfer from Panathinaikos

In September 2016 signs with Chania and becoming one of the best players for Chania

On 29 July 2017, after a great season for Chania with 7 goals and 8 assists, he joined Panachaiki. On 5 November 207 he made his debut and scored a brace in a 3–0 away win against Kallithea. On 3 December 2017 he scored the only goal in a 1–0 home win against Doxa Drama.

References

External links
 Scoresway.com Profile

1993 births
Living people
Greek footballers
Greek expatriate footballers
Super League Greece players
Panathinaikos F.C. players
Panachaiki F.C. players
Acharnaikos F.C. players
AO Chania F.C. players
Veria NFC players
Royale Union Saint-Gilloise players
Expatriate footballers in Belgium
Association football forwards